Dyschirius criddlei is a species of ground beetle in the subfamily Scaritinae. It was described by Fall in 1925.

References

criddlei
Beetles described in 1925